Saisnarine Kowlessar is a Guyanese politician. He served as Minister of Finance from 1999 to 2006. He previously also lectured at the University of Guyana.

In 2018, Kowlessar was arrested and released on bail for "to turn up at that law enforcement arm of the Guyana Police Force" related to the sale of lands held by the National Industrial and Commercial Investments Limited.

In December 2020, he became chairman of the Guyana Revenue Authority.

References 

Living people
Year of birth missing (living people)
Place of birth missing (living people)
Government ministers of Guyana
Finance ministers of Guyana
People's Progressive Party (Guyana) politicians
21st-century Guyanese politicians